WKEL may refer to:

 WKEL (FM), a radio station (88.1 FM) licensed to serve Webster, New York, United States
 WYRA, a radio station (98.5 FM) licensed to serve Confluence, Pennsylvania, United States, which held the call sign WKEL from 2007 to 2012